Booborowie is a locality in South Australia. At the 2016 census, the Booborowie district had a population of 218.

Booborowie Station 
In 1843, Dr William James Browne and his brother Dr John Harris Browne took up the Booborowie run. In 1851 they purchased a crown lease of 153 square miles, and in 1853 the brothers purchased 46,978 acres of the lease.

The Browne brothers established a merino stud and ran shorthorn cattle. They went on to purchase properties on the Adelaide Plains, at Mount Gambier, the Flinders Ranges, and the Eyre Peninsula, and were instrumental in establishing Katherine in the Northern Territory. This led to a large sheep and cattle drive, under the supervision of Alfred Giles, to leave South Australia in 1878.

The northern portion of the station was sold to Henry Dutton and George Melrose in 1897. The remainder of the station was sold in 1910 and 1912 for closer settlement.

History of the township 
Baldry Township was first surveyed in 1875 near Leighton, but was abandoned at the time. The Booborowie Township was proclaimed on 29 March 1877.

Being a farming community, the chief products produced are wool, wheat, lucerne and canola.

The spelling "Booboorowie" was common in the 19th century.

The historic Booborowie Homestead and the former Booborowie Council Chambers are listed on the South Australian Heritage Register.

Today, Booborowie is a popular destination for visitors enjoying the rural scenery, historic buildings and camping facilities at the town oval. The town is serviced by a primary school (opened 1892) with playgroup, and a grocer, incorporating hardware and post office facilities.

References
Notes

Citations

Towns in South Australia
Mid North (South Australia)